"Ceremony" is a song written by Joy Division, and first released as New Order's debut single in 1981. The song and its B-side, "In a Lonely Place", were written and recorded as Joy Division prior to the death of Ian Curtis. Both were re-recorded and carried over to Joy Division's re-formation under the name New Order.

New Order released the song as a single twice, firstly in January 1981 and secondly in September 1981 featuring new member Gillian Gilbert, with the latter recording later appearing on the album Substance.

History

Joy Division
"Ceremony" was one of the last Joy Division songs to be composed, with lyrics written by Ian Curtis. There are three recorded versions by Joy Division in existence. The first is a live version, available on the Still album, from their final concert at High Hall, Birmingham University on 2 May 1980. The second, available on the Heart and Soul four-disc box set, is from a studio session on 14 May 1980, four days before Curtis' suicide. It was the band's last recording. The third is a version recorded at the soundcheck on the afternoon of 2 May 1980 (along with "Decades") and is only available via bootleg. In all recordings, the vocals are only partially audible.

New Order
After the death of Ian Curtis, the remaining members of Joy Division regrouped as New Order. Their first release was a re-recording of "Ceremony" as a stand-alone single backed with "In a Lonely Place", with guitarist Bernard Sumner taking over lead vocals. Because Curtis had never transcribed the lyrics to "Ceremony" and because his singing was muted to the point of near-inaudibility on all surviving recordings, Sumner reportedly had to put them through a graphic equalizer to approximate the lyrics.

New Order "Version 1" March 1981
In March 6 of 1981, the first single of New Order and the first version of the song "Ceremony" was released by Factory Records (with the name FAC 33). Initially released as a 7" single, it was reissued as a 12" two months later. Martin Hannett (Joy Division's producer) produced the record and Peter Saville designed the sleeve artwork for both releases.

The 7" record was issued in a stamped gold-bronze sleeve. The 12" sleeve was a completely separate design: gold typography on a green background.

New Order "Version 2" September 1981
In September 1981, "Ceremony" was re-released. Gillian Gilbert played guitar on this new recording just after she joined the band. Martin Hannett again produced the record. The single was re-issued as a 12" only, with the same catalogue number (FAC 33). The original is approximately 4:34 minutes in length while the re-recording is 4:23. The re-recorded version was used on all subsequent compilations until Singles in 2005, when the original March '81 recording was released on CD for the first time.

There are differences in the recordings. Version 1 has a more "Joy Division sound", with throbbing bass, distorted guitar, spacey vocals, and solid drums also contributing a wash of cymbals. In Version 2 the bass is diminished, cymbals restrained, and the vocals are "drier". The guitar has a sound typical of that used on the album Movement. Drum hits in the opening verse are dramatically panned in the mix. There is a greater contrast between verse and chorus, with the latter sections reaching some of the emotional pitch of the original. In addition to the new recording of the A-side track, the B-side track "In a Lonely Place" was slightly remixed and added more synthetic "thunder" noises throughout the song. This alternate mix also appears on the second disc of Substance and subsequent compilations.

The sleeve (pictured) was changed to a light cream with a vertical blue stripe, though with the same motif and typography as the original 12" single. After supply of the re-designed sleeve ran out, copies of the originally-designed sleeve were re-used. Accordingly, the two versions of the song were packaged indiscriminately in the original sleeve. However, the run-groove notation (phrases pressed onto the vinyl) differ according to the version. The original says "watching love grow forever", while the re-recording's etching says "this is why events unnerve me"; both phrases are excerpts from the lyrics of "Ceremony".

Re-issue
The single was re-issued again in April 2011 for Record Store Day in a white sleeve. This limited edition release (only 800 copies) plays at 33 rpm. It features the New Order recordings of "Ceremony" (the pre-Gillian Gilbert take) and "In a Lonely Place" on one side, with the rare Joy Division recordings of the same tracks on the flip side—"Ceremony" comes from the 1997 Heart & Soul box set but the version of "In a Lonely Place" is a recently discovered complete take and not the same as the version featured on Heart & Soul. The Heart & Soul version is cut short at 2:32, whereas this newly discovered take runs for 5:45 and the full Ian Curtis vocal of "In a Lonely Place" is heard here for the first time, complete with the missing third verse.

Composition
"Ceremony" is a mid-tempo rock song in the key of C major. The song contains two implied chords, C major and F major, shown through the driving bassline. The song does not contain any keyboards, which became a common staple in Joy Division's later sound, and New Order's eventual sound. The song, in its original recording, featured a slower tempo than that of the September re-record, as well as clearer production and a more processed guitar tone. "Ceremony" utilises quiet-loud dynamics and artificial reverb to give the song its trademark flowing atmosphere. The song reverts to its quieter stage for the guitar solo, a practice carried over to New Order by Bernard Sumner.

Notable covers
The song has been covered by a number of artists, including:
Radiohead on their "Thumbs Down" webcast on 9 November 2007.
Galaxie 500 on their 1989 Blue Thunder EP (available on the re-issue of On Fire).
Xiu Xiu on their 2002 debut EP Chapel of the Chimes and on their 2007 compilation album Remixed & Covered
Chromatics on their 2014 extended play "Cherry", featuring Ida No
Day Wave on their 2016 live album "Spotify Sessions", recorded at SXSW 2016

Track listing

Usually a green sleeve.

Usually a cream and blue sleeve.

White sleeve

Chart positions

Notes:
 1 – Charted in 1983 and 1984.

References

1980 songs
1981 debut singles
Joy Division songs
New Order (band) songs
Songs written by Bernard Sumner
Songs written by Ian Curtis
Songs written by Peter Hook
Songs written by Stephen Morris (musician)
Factory Records singles
UK Independent Singles Chart number-one singles